James Wolcott (born December 10, 1952) is an American journalist, known for his critique of contemporary media.  Wolcott is the cultural critic for Vanity Fair and contributes to The New Yorker. He had his own blog on Vanity Fair magazine's main site which was awarded a Webby Award in 2007.

Background and education
Wolcott was born in Baltimore, Maryland, and raised in a suburban setting. He attended Maryland's Frostburg State College for two years. From there, he moved to New York City, to work at The Village Voice, first in the circulation department answering phone complaints, then as a receptionist. He is married to Laura Jacobs, a contributing editor at Vanity Fair. He began practicing the Transcendental Meditation technique in 2007.

Career

Since arriving in New York, Wolcott has been a columnist on media and pop culture for such publications as Esquire, Harper's Magazine, The New Yorker, The New York Review of Books, and New York Magazine. He was taken on at Vanity Fair  by  Leo Lerman, then the magazine's editor.

Wolcott's novel, The Catsitters, was published in 2001. In 2004, he published Attack Poodles and Other Media Mutants, a critique of right-wing media in the United States. In addition, he recently contributed the foreword to Geoffrey Beene's forthcoming book, Identity.

His memoir Lucking Out: My Life Getting Down and Semi-Dirty in Seventies New York was published October 25, 2011.

In 2017, he advocated for the overthrow of the Trump administration by American intelligence agencies.

Awards and honors
2014 PEN/Diamonstein-Spielvogel Award for the Art of the Essay for Critical Mass

Bibliography

Fiction

Non-fiction

 Lucking Out: My Life Getting Down and Semi-Dirty in Seventies New York 
 Critical Mass: Four Decades of Essays, Reviews, Hand Grenades, and Hurrahs 

 "Sisyphus at the Selectric" (review of Blake Bailey, Philip Roth: The Biography, Cape, April 2021, 898 pp., ; Ira Nadel, Philip Roth: A Counterlife, Oxford, May 2021, 546 pp., ; and Benjamin Taylor, Here We Are: My Friendship with Philip Roth, Penguin, May 2020, 192 pp.), London Review of Books, vol. 43, no. 10 (20 May 2021), pp. 3, 5–10. Wolcott: "He's a great writer but is he a great writer? And what does 'great writer' mean now anyhow?" (p. 10.)

References

External links
 James Wolcott article archive at Vanity Fair
 James Wolcott's blog, before 2006-10-18
 Maneker, Marion, "The King James Version: Critic James Wolcott, the reigning monarch of the literary put-down, is about to publish his first novel, and legions of his victims are already sharpening their knives", New York magazine, June 11, 2001
 Bernhard, Brendan, "Medium Cool: James Wolcott on lowbrow vs. highbrow, common sense and his first novel, The Catsitters", LA Weekly, June 27, 2001.

1952 births
Living people
21st-century American novelists
American bloggers
American male journalists
American male novelists
Frostburg State University alumni
PEN/Diamonstein-Spielvogel Award winners
Vanity Fair (magazine) people
Writers from Baltimore
Writers from New York City
The Village Voice people
21st-century American male writers
Novelists from New York (state)
Novelists from Maryland
21st-century American non-fiction writers
American male bloggers